Amoxicillin/clavulanic acid, also known as co-amoxiclav or amox-clav, sold under the brand name Augmentin, among others, is an antibiotic medication used for the treatment of a number of bacterial infections. It is a combination consisting of amoxicillin, a β-lactam antibiotic, and potassium clavulanate, a β-lactamase inhibitor. It is specifically used for otitis media, streptococcal pharyngitis, pneumonia, cellulitis, urinary tract infections, and animal bites. It is taken by mouth or by injection into a vein.

Common side effects include diarrhea, vomiting, and allergic reactions. It also increases the risk of yeast infections, headaches, and blood clotting problems. It is not recommended in people with a history of a penicillin allergy. It is relatively safe for use during pregnancy.

Amoxicillin/clavulanic acid was approved for medical use in the United States in 1984. It is on the World Health Organization's List of Essential Medicines. The World Health Organization classifies amoxicillin/clavulanic-acid as critically important for human medicine. It is available as a generic medication. In 2020, it was the 107th most commonly prescribed medication in the United States, with more than 6million prescriptions.

Medical uses
Amoxicillin/clavulanic acid is widely used to treat or prevent many infections caused by susceptible bacteria, such as:
urinary tract infections
respiratory tract infections
skin and soft tissue infections
sinus infections
tonsillitis
cat scratches
infections caused by the bacterial flora of the mouth, such as:
dental infections
infected animal bites
infected human bites (including uncomplicated "clenched-fist" or "reverse-bite" injuries)

It is also used for tuberculosis that is resistant to other treatments. The World Health Organization recommends giving amoxicillin-clavulanate along with meropenem as one of the therapeutic options in drug resistant tuberculosis. However, across the spectrum of dosage of amoxicillin-clavulanate combination, the dose of clavulanate is constant at 125 mg, whereas the dose of amoxicillin varies at 250 mg, 500 mg and 875 mg. Thus the use of low dose amoxicillin-clavulanate in combination with meropenem may be used in part of treatment regime for drug resistant TB and this has been demonstrated in a clinical setting also.

Adverse effects
Possible side effects include diarrhea, vomiting, nausea, thrush, and skin rash. These do not usually require medical attention. As with all antimicrobial agents, antibiotic-associated diarrhea due to Clostridium difficile infection—sometimes leading to pseudomembranous colitis—may occur during or after treatment with amoxicillin/clavulanic acid.

Rarely, cholestatic jaundice (also referred to as cholestatic hepatitis, a form of liver toxicity) has been associated with amoxicillin/clavulanic acid. The reaction may occur up to several weeks after treatment has stopped, and usually takes weeks to resolve. It is more frequent in men, older people, and those who have taken long courses of treatment; the estimated overall incidence is one in 100,000 exposures. In the United Kingdom, co-amoxiclav carries a warning from the Committee on Safety of Medicines to this effect.

As all aminopenicillins, amoxicillin has been associated with Stevens–Johnson syndrome/toxic epidermal necrolysis, although these reactions are very rare.

History
British scientists working at Beecham (now part of GlaxoSmithKline), filed for patent protection for the drug combination in 1977, which was granted in 1982.
It was sold under the brand name Augmentin.

Preparations
Amoxicillin/clavulanic acid is the International Nonproprietary Name (INN) and co-amoxiclav is the British Approved Name (BAN).

Many branded products indicate their strengths as the quantity of amoxicillin. Augmentin 250, for example, contains 250 mg of amoxicillin and 125 mg of clavulanic acid.

An intravenous preparation has been available in the UK since 1985, but no parenteral preparation is available in the US; the nearest equivalent is ampicillin/sulbactam.

Suspensions of amoxicillin/clavulanic acid are available for use in children. They must be refrigerated to maintain effectiveness.

Veterinary use
Amoxicillin/clavulanic acid is used in numerous animals for a variety of conditions:
 Dogs: periodontitis, kennel cough
 Cats: urinary tract infections, skin and soft tissue infections
 Calves: enteritis, navel ill
 Cattle: respiratory tract infections, soft tissue infections, metritis, mastitis
 Pigs: respiratory tract infections, colibacillosis, mastitis, metritis, agalactia

In combination with prednisolone, it is used for intramammary infusion for the treatment of mastitis in lactating cows.  Trade names include Clavaseptin, Clavamox, and Synulox.

Amoxicillin/clavulanic acid is banned from use in domestic-food animals (cattle, swine, etc.) in both the US and Europe; in the UK, Synulox can be used in domestic-food animals as long as a specified withdrawal period is observed.

Bacterial resistance
Bacterial antibiotic resistance is a growing problem in veterinary medicine. Amoxicillin/clavulanic acid is reported to be effective against clinical Klebsiella infections, but is not efficacious against Pseudomonas infections.

References

External links 
 

Combination antibiotics
Hepatotoxins
GSK plc brands
Penicillins
World Health Organization essential medicines
Wikipedia medicine articles ready to translate